Lirainosaurus (meaning "slender lizard"; from the Basque lirain, meaning "slender", and the Greek sauros, meaning "lizard")is a genus of titanosaur sauropod which lived in what is now Spain. The type species, Lirainosaurus astibiae, was described by Sanz, Powell, Le Loeuff, Martinez, and Pereda-Suberbiola in 1999.

Classification
 
This genus was based on a skull fragment, isolated teeth, several vertebrae including the holotype - an anterior caudal vertebra, and appendicular bones from the Late Cretaceous of Laño (northern Spain). New material from Laño, Spain described by Diaz et al. (2013), which includes cervical, dorsal and caudal vertebrae, dorsal ribs, and a haemal arch, has been assigned to Lirainosaurus. According to Diaz et al., Lirainosaurus can be distinguished by the presence of a lamina in the interzygapophyseal fossa of the most proximal caudal vertebrae; and the spinopostzygapophyseal structure not posteriorly projected in the posterior caudal vertebrae. With respect to phylogeny, the combination of characters present in the new axial remains described, supports the placement of Lirainosaurus as a derived lithostrotian titanosaur closely related to the Saltasaurinae. The results of an unpublished SVPCA abstract published in 2016 narrow down the exact position of Lirainosaurus by placing it as closer to Alamosaurus and Opisthocoelicaudia than to Saltasaurus. Later, Diez Diaz et al. (2018) erected Lirainosaurinae to accommodate Lirainosaurus as well as Ampelosaurus and Atsinganosaurus.

Paleoenvironment

Specimens have been found in the North-Pyrenean site of Bellevue, which is located at the base of the Marnes de la Maurine member of the Marnes Rouges Inférieures Formation. Marine biostratigraphic testing of the formation places its age somewhere between Late Campanian to Early Maastrichtian. Other contemporary dinosaurs in the Bellevue layer include the titanosaur sauropod Ampelosaurus, the rhabdodontid Rhabdodon and indeterminate ankylosaur and Dromaeosauridae elements.

Other material ascribed to Lirainosaurus have been found in the Fox-Amphoux–Métisson locality, where unfortunately no magnetostratigraphic dating has been performed. However, the local stratigraphy presents the same succession of facies as in the Aix-en-Provence Basin, which is also in the Late Campanian to Early Maastrichtian age.

References

Titanosaurs
Late Cretaceous dinosaurs of Europe
Campanian life
Cretaceous Spain
Fossils of Spain
Fossil taxa described in 1999